The 79th Grey Cup was the 1991 Canadian Football League championship game played between the Toronto Argonauts and the Calgary Stampeders at Winnipeg Stadium in Winnipeg, Manitoba. The Argonauts defeated the Stampeders 36–21 in an entertaining game.

Game summary
Toronto Argonauts (36) - TDs, Ed Berry, Darrell K. Smith, Raghib "Rocket" Ismail, Paul Masotti; FGs Lance Chomyc (2); cons., Chomyc (4); singles Chomyc (2).

Calgary Stampeders (21) - TDs, Danny Barrett, Allen Pitts; FGs, Mark McLoughlin (2); cons., McLoughlin (2); single. McLoughlin.

First Quarter
TOR - TD Berry 50 yard interception return (Chomyc convert)
TOR - Single by Chomyc
CGY - TD Barrett 1 yard run (McLoughlin convert)

Second Quarter
CGY – FG McLoughlin
TOR – FG Chomyc

Third Quarter
CGY - Single McLoughlin
CGY - FG McLoughlin
TOR - Single Chomyc
TOR - TD Smith 48 yard pass from Dunigan (Chomyc convert)

Fourth Quarter
TOR - FG Chomyc
CGY - TD Pitts 12 yard pass from Barrett (McLoughlin convert)
TOR - TD Ismail 87 yard kickoff return (Chomyc convert)
TOR - TD Masotti 36 yard pass from Dunigan (Chomyc convert)

The Grey Cup was held in Winnipeg for the first time, but it had more of a Hollywood feeling. The Toronto Argonauts capped off a memorable season under the new ownership of Los Angeles Kings owner Bruce McNall, hockey player Wayne Gretzky and actor John Candy with a win over Calgary.

The Argos started the game with a bang as defensive back Ed Berry intercepted Calgary quarterback Danny Barrett's first pass attempt and returned it 50 yards for a touchdown.

Barrett made up for this miscue late in the first quarter, calling his own number on a one-yard run over the goal line. Toronto led 8-7 after 15 minutes.

The teams exchanged field goals in the second quarter, as the Argos carried their one-point lead into halftime.

The Toronto offence got kick started in the second half. With the Argos trailing 14-12 with three minutes remaining in the third quarter, quarterback Matt Dunigan threw a 48-yard strike to Darrell K. Smith, giving the Boatmen some life.

Reggie Pleasant stepped in front of a Barrett pass in the fourth quarter, helping to set up a Lance Chomyc field goal to make it a 22-14 score. It was Pleasant's second interception of the game.

Calgary receiver Allen Pitts' narrowed the gap to 22-21 on a 12-yard touchdown reception. But Raghib "Rocket" Ismail, a much publicized pickup by the Argos in the off-season, returned the ensuing kickoff 87 yards for a touchdown with 10:26 remaining, sealing Calgary's fate.

Keyvan Jenkins fumbled on the following kickoff, and Argos linebacker Keith Castello covered the ball to set up a 36-yard touchdown from Dunigan to Paul Masotti to officially put an end to the game and their championship season.

Trivia
 The temperature at kickoff was -16 °C (3 °F), making the game the coldest Grey Cup final. 
 The 1991 game is, to date, the last Grey Cup completed in daylight.
 Matt Dunigan, who completed only 12 of 29 passes, throwing for 142 yards, including two TD passes, was playing with a separated shoulder (frozen for the Grey Cup game), suffered the previous week in the East Final. He finally completed a Grey Cup victory from start to finish. Previously, he lost with the Edmonton Eskimos in 1986, was injured out of Edmonton's classic 1987 victory, lost with the BC Lions in 1988 to the Blue Bombers, and later would lose with the Winnipeg Blue Bombers in 1992 and was unable to play in the 1993 Grey Cup (due to injury, with Winnipeg).
 Danny Barrett, who hit 34 of 56 passes for 377 yards and a touchdown, but also 3 interceptions, set records for passes attempted and completed in a Grey Cup game.
 Raghib 'Rocket' Ismail's 87 yard kickoff return is a Grey Cup record for kickoffs. Surprisingly, Ismail (who went on to a long NFL career) admitted in a recent television interview on the CBC that he had not seen a replay of the return since the game (some 15 years earlier). The CBC provided him with a DVD copy of the game.
 This was the first Grey Cup game since 1973 that a single Most Valuable Player award was given out; from 1974 to 1990, two awards were given one (one to an offensive player, one to a defensive player).
 Calgary had 28 first downs compared to Toronto's seven. The Stampeders had 406 yards of total offence compared to 174 for the Argos.
 It was the Toronto Argonauts's first Grey Cup championship since 1983.
 The CFL originally only engraved McNall's name on the Grey Cup as the Argos' owner. The names of Gretzky and (the by then-deceased) Candy were added in 2007. Gretzky is one of four people to have his name engraved on both the Stanley Cup and the Grey Cup (the other three are Lionel Conacher, Carl Voss and Normie Kwong).
 With the shutdown of the league-run Canadian Football Network broadcast service after the end of the previous season, this was the first Grey Cup game to be broadcast on only one network in Canada, CBC Television. All Grey Cup games since have been broadcast on CBC or, since 2008, TSN.

1991 CFL Playoffs

West Division
 Semi-final (November 10 @ Calgary, Alberta) Calgary Stampeders 43-41 BC Lions
 Final (November 17 @ Edmonton, Alberta) Calgary Stampeders 38-36 Edmonton Eskimos

East Division
 Semi-final (November 10 @ Winnipeg, Manitoba) Winnipeg Blue Bombers 26-8 Ottawa Rough Riders
 Final (November 17 @ Toronto, Ontario) Toronto Argonauts 42-3 Winnipeg Blue Bombers

External links
 

Grey Cup
Grey Cup
Grey Cups hosted in Winnipeg
1991 in Manitoba
Calgary Stampeders
Toronto Argonauts
1990s in Winnipeg
1991 in Canadian television
November 1991 sports events in Canada
Events in Winnipeg